The alpha-7 nicotinic receptor, also known as the α7 receptor, is a type of nicotinic acetylcholine receptor implicated in long-term memory, consisting entirely of α7 subunits.  As with other nicotinic acetylcholine receptors, functional α7 receptors are pentameric [i.e., (α7)5 stoichiometry].

It is located in the brain, spleen, and lymphocytes of lymph nodes where activation yields post- and presynaptic excitation, mainly by increased Ca2+ permeability.

Further, recent work has implicated this receptor as being important for generation of adult mammal neurons in the retina.  Functional α7 receptors are present in the submucous plexus neurons of the guinea-pig ileum.

Medical relevance 
Recent work has demonstrated a potential role in reducing inflammatory neurotoxicity in stroke, myocardial infarction, sepsis, and Alzheimer's disease.

An α7 nicotinic agonist appears to have positive effects on neurocognition in persons with schizophrenia.

Activation of α7 nicotinic acetylcholine receptor on mast cells, is a mechanism by which nicotine enhances atherosclerosis.

Both α4β2 and α7 nicotinic receptors appear to be critical for memory, working memory, learning, and attention.

α7-nicotinic receptors also appear to be involved in cancer progression. They have been shown to mediate cancer cell proliferation and metastasis. α7 receptors are also involved in angiogenic and neurogenic activity, and have anti-apoptotic effects.

Ligands

Agonists 

 (+)-N-(1-azabicyclo[2.2.2]oct-3-yl)benzo[b]furan- 2-carboxamide: potent and highly subtype-selective
 Tilorone.
 A-582941: partial agonist; activates ERK1/2 and CREB phosphorylation; enhances cognitive performance
 AR-R17779: full agonist, nootropic
 Amyloid beta: neurotoxic marker of Alzheimer's disease
 TC-1698: subtype-selective; neuroprotective effects via activation of the JAK2/PI-3K cascade, neutralized by angiotensin II AT(2) receptor activation
 Bradanicline - partial agonist, in development for treatment of schizophrenia
 Encenicline - partial agonist with nootropic properties, in development for treatment of schizophrenia and Alzheimer's disease 
 GTS-21 - partial agonist, in development for treatment of schizophrenia and/or Alzheimer's disease
 PHA-543,613 - selective and potent agonist with nootropic properties 
 PNU-282,987 - selective and potent agonist, but may cause long QT syndrome
 PHA-709829: potent and subtype-selective; robust in vivo efficacy in a rat auditory sensory gating model
 Analogues: improved hERG safety profile over PNU-282,987
SSR-180,711: partial agonist
 Tropisetron: subtype-selective partial agonist; 5-HT3 receptor antagonist
 WAY-317,538 - selective potent full agonist with nootropic and neuroprotective properties
 Anabasine
 Acetylcholine
 Nicotine
 Epiboxidine
 Choline
 ICH-3: subtype-selective partial agonist

Positive Allosteric Modulators (PAMs) 
At least two types of positive allosteric modulators (PAMs) can be distinguished.

 PNU-120,596
NS-1738: marginal effects on α7 desensitization kinetics; modestly brain-penetrant
 AVL-3288: unlike the above PAMs, AVL-3288 does not affect α7 desensitization kinetics, and is readily brain penetrant. Improves cognitive behavior in animal models In clinical development for cognitive deficits in schizophrenia.
 A-867744
 Ivermectin

Other 
 Nefiracetam

Antagonists 
It is found that anandamide and ethanol cause an additive inhibition on the function of α7-receptor by interacting with distinct regions of the receptor. Although ethanol inhibition of the α7-receptor is likely to involve the N-terminal region of the receptor, the site of action for anandamide is located in the transmembrane and carboxyl-terminal domains of the receptors.
 Anandamide
 α-Bungarotoxin
 α-Conotoxin ArIB[V11L,V16D]: potent and highly subtype-selective; slowly reversible
β-Caryophyllene
 Bupropion (very weakly)
 Dehydronorketamine
 Ethanol
 Hydroxybupropion (very weakly)
 Hydroxynorketamine
 Ketamine
 Kynurenic acid
 Memantine
Lobeline
 Methyllycaconitine
 Norketamine
 Quinolizidine (–)-1-epi-207I: α7 subtype preferring blocker

See also 
 α3β2-Nicotinic receptor
 α3β4-Nicotinic receptor
 α4β2-Nicotinic receptor
 RIC3, a chaperone protein for α7 receptors
 Endocannabinoids

References 

Nicotinic acetylcholine receptors
Ion channels